The 2015 Nigerian Senate election in Lagos State was held on March 28, 2015, to elect members of the Nigerian Senate to represent Lagos State. Oluremi Tinubu representing Lagos Central, Gbenga Bareehu Ashafa representing Lagos East and Solomon Olamilekan Adeola representing Lagos West all won on the platform of All Progressives Congress.

Overview

Summary

Results

Lagos Central 
The two major parties All Progressives Congress and People's Democratic Party registered with the Independent National Electoral Commission to contest in the election. ACN candidate Oluremi Tinubu won the election, defeating PDP candidate Dosunmu Adegboyega and other party candidates.

Lagos East 
The two major parties All Progressives Congress and People's Democratic Party registered with the Independent National Electoral Commission to contest in the election. ACN candidate Gbenga Bareehu Ashafa won the election, defeating PDP candidate Olabisi Salis-Fakos and other party candidates.

Lagos West 
The two major parties All Progressives Congress and People's Democratic Party registered with the Independent National Electoral Commission to contest in the election. ACN candidate Solomon Olamilekan Adeola won the election, defeating PDP candidate Segun "Aeroland" Adewale and other party candidates.

References 

Lagos State Senate elections
March 2015 events in Nigeria
Lag
Political events in Lagos State
2015 politics in Lagos State